James Franklin McCall (born June 25, 1934) is a retired United States Army lieutenant general who served as Comptroller of the United States Army from 1988 to 1991. He is a 1956 graduate of the University of Pennsylvania with a B.S. degree in economics from the Wharton School. McCall later earned a master's degree in military science from the Army Command and General Staff College and an M.B.A. in comptrollership from Syracuse University. He is also a graduate of the Industrial College of the Armed Forces.

References

1934 births
Living people
Wharton School of the University of Pennsylvania alumni
Military personnel from Philadelphia
African-American United States Army personnel
United States Army Command and General Staff College
United States Army personnel of the Vietnam War
Recipients of the Air Medal
Martin J. Whitman School of Management alumni
Recipients of the Meritorious Service Medal (United States)
Recipients of the Legion of Merit
United States Army generals
Recipients of the Distinguished Service Medal (US Army)
21st-century African-American people
African Americans in the Vietnam War